James is the second extended play by American singer-songwriter Phoebe Ryan, released on October 27, 2017 by Columbia Records. It serves as the follow-up to her 2015 extended play, Mine (2015). The EP was preceded by the release of three singles, and was promoted by a tour span from late October to mid-November 2017.

Background and composition 
James is a pop EP that bases its musical composition in 1980s-inspired synth-pop, modern electropop, and contemporary R&B. The album lyrically chronicles a relationship from beginning to end.

Promotion

Singles 
 "Forgetting All About You" featuring American R&B singer, blackbear was released on August 4, 2017 as the lead single from the EP. It was supported by both a music video and a performance at the Billboard Hot 100 Festival.
 "Be Real" was released as the second single on September 8, 2017. A remix EP was released the same month.
 "James Has Changed" was released as the third and final single on October 6, 2017.

Tour 
In addition to the three singles being promoted, Ryan also embarked on a tour in support of the extended play. The tour began on October 31, 2017 and concluded on November 14, 2017.

Critical reception 
Mike Wass of Idolator gave the album a positive review; he praised Ryan for "[examining] matters of the heart with rare honesty and a razor-sharp wit. Each song leads effortlessly into the next, which is no easy feat considering that they explore wildly different sounds."

Track listing

Personnel 
Credits adapted from Tidal.

 Phoebe Ryan – lead vocals, songwriting
 Kyle Shearer – songwriting (tracks 1–2), record engineering (tracks 1–2)
 Nathaniel Campany – songwriting (tracks 1–2)
 Valley Girl – production (tracks 1–2)
 Joe Zook – mix engineering (track 1)
 Paul Hammond – engineer assistance (track 1)
 Mitch McCarthy – mix engineering (track 2)
 Justin Shturtz – master engineering
 Jordan "DJ Swivel" Young – mix engineering (tracks 3–5)

 Lucas Nordqvist – songwriting (track 3)
 Jurek Reunamäki – songwriting (track 3)
 Frans Mernick – record engineering (track 3)
 Antti Hynninen – songwriting, production, record engineering (track 3)
 Joonas Laaksoharju – songwriting (track 4)
 Axel Ehnström – songwriting (track 4)
 Big Taste – songwriting, production (tracks 4–5)
 Blackbear – featured artist, songwriting (track 5)
 Joseph Kirkland – songwriting (track 5)
 Jason Dean – songwriting (track 5)

References 

EPs by American artists
2017 EPs
Columbia Records EPs
Pop music EPs